Historical Atlas of China is a 2-volume work published in Taiwan in 1980 and 1983.
The volumes are:
 Historical territories.
 Major cities, economic maps, irrigation and transportation networks, social changes, artifacts, wars.
Unlike many other historical maps that placed emphasis on placenames, this set of maps contained many restorations of historical sites.

China
History books about China
1980 non-fiction books
1983 non-fiction books
Geographic history of China